Phoenix Contact, headquartered in Blomberg, Ostwestfalen-Lippe, Germany, is a manufacturer of industrial automation, interconnection, and interface solutions. The company develops terminal blocks, relays, connectors, signal conditioners, power supplies, controllers & PLCs, I/O systems, Industrial Ethernet, controller system cabling, PCB terminal blocks & connectors, and surge suppression. In addition, Phoenix Contact manufactures products for use with Modbus, DeviceNet, EtherNet/IP, CANopen, PROFIBUS and PROFINET networks.

The company was founded in 1923 in Essen, Germany and in 2021, accounted for annual sales in excess of 2.97 billion Euro (approximately US$3.1 billion). Phoenix Contact manufactures in over 10 nations: Germany, USA, China, India, Poland, Greece, Brazil, Turkey, Sweden and Argentina and employs 20,300 employees in 50 international subsidiaries.

History

1923: In Essen, Germany, Hugo Knümann founded a commercial agency for electrical products and sells contact wire terminals for electric trams. Two floors of a rented building in Essen served as the company headquarters: offices were on the first floor; the second story was used for assembly. Soon after, the young company became Phönix Elektrizitätsgesellschaft (Phoenix Electricity Company).

1928: Working together with Rhine-Westphalia Electricity Works (RWE), Hugo Knümann developed the first modular terminal block.

1937: Ursula Lampmann, later to become one of the partners, joined the company as the first commercial member of staff. For almost six decades, she continued to play an active role in the company.

1943: On March 13, the company offices near the Essen train station were destroyed in an air raid. The company headquarters moved to the "Bürgerheim" restaurant in Blomberg. It is not until 1948 that part of the 30-strong company moved back to Essen.

1949: Hugo Knümann enlisted Josef Eisert, who owned numerous terminal block patents, as technical director for his company. Eisert revised the entire product range.

1953: Following the death of Hugo Knümann, Josef Eisert and Ursula Lampmann took over the management of Phönix Klemmen. Through a merger, sister company Phoenix Feinbau was created in Lüdenscheid – this marked the birth of the future Phoenix Contact Group.

1957: The first two production facilities opened at the Flachsmarkt site in Blomberg. Phönix Klemmen welcomed its first apprentice, Helmut Conrad.

1961: Klaus Eisert, son of Josef Eisert, joined the company as a managing partner. He remained in this role as of 2018. His brothers Jörg and Gerd join the company in the following year.

1966: The Essen location closed.  Over 300 employees now work at the company's headquarters in Blomberg.

1981: In the early 1980s, Phönix Klemmen started establishing subsidiaries in foreign markets. The subsidiary in Switzerland marked the first in 1981. Sweden and the USA followed in the mid-1980s. As of 2018, Phoenix Contact is represented in over 50 countries.

1982: Phönix Klemmen become Phoenix Contact, to reflect how electronic functions are becoming increasingly integrated in terminal technology.

1983: The company developed its sensitive device and systems electronics to be protected against surge voltages. Phoenix Contact special terminal blocks, Interface, and TRABTECH represented further innovations from the 1980s.

1987: The Phoenix Contact INTERBUS fieldbus system had a strong impact on automation by offering cross-system openness from the sensor to the controller.

1994: The independent Phoenix Testlab testing institute in Blomberg began its work as Phoenix EMV-Test. The company opened a subsidiary in China.

1996: High-tech electronics manufactured in-house: a key site was founded in Bad Pyrmont in the form of Phoenix Contact Electronics.

2001: The plant in Bad Pyrmont was expanded to around 10,000 square meters.

2005/2007: A plant covering 12,000 square meters was opened on Thaler Landstraße in 2005. Just two years later, the five story, 15,000 square meter "Innovation Center Electronics" opened, housing the company's Development, Marketing, and Sales departments. The company saw €1.072 billion in revenue worldwide. The number of employees approached 10,000.

2009: Phoenix Contact continued investing and built a 20,000 square meter production hall in Blomberg, representing the company's largest building.

2010: PHOENIX CONTACT Deutschland GmbH was founded. The Phoenix Contact Germany sales subsidiary was established, with over 300 employees in the field and in the sales offices.

2012: The company organized into three segments: Device and PCB connection technology, Industrial components for electrical engineering and electronics, and Industry-specific automation solutions.

2015: Frank Stührenberg has been the managing director, who started out as an assistant to the management at Phoenix in 1992; he is also a board member of ZVEI.

2018: Phoenix Contact had continuously increased the number of employees to over 17,000.

Worldwide locations

US headquarters:
Phoenix Contact USA, one of the company's first international subsidiaries, was established in 1981 in Middletown, Pennsylvania.

Southeast Asia headquarters:
 Phoenix Contact SEA was established in 1998, with its office in Singapore, overseeing offices in Malaysia, Thailand, Vietnam, Indonesia, Philippines and Myanmar.

Production sites:
Germany: Blomberg, Bad Pyrmont, Lüdenscheid, Herrenberg, Filderstadt. 
Other: Harrisburg (USA), Nanjing (China), New Delhi (India), Nowy Tomysl (Poland), Vasiliko (Greece), São Paulo (Brazil), Bursa (Turkey), Älvdalen (Sweden), Ciudad Autónoma de Buenos Aires (Argentina), Saudi Arabia

Products
Some examples of Phoenix Contact's industrial offerings are:

 Circuit Breakers
 Controllers and PLCs
 Cyber-security and Remote Connectivity
 I/O Systems: IP20 Remote I/O (Inline & Axioline F), IP67 Remote I/O (Fieldline)
 Industrial Connectors, Cables and Cordsets
 Industrial Ethernet
 Industrial PC
 Marking & Labeling
 PCB Enclosures and Boxes
 Power Supplies & UPS
 Relay Modules
 Signal conditioners
 Surge Protection
 Systems Cabling for DCS & PLC
 Terminal blocks
 Wireless Data Communication

See also
 EtherNet/IP
 Industrial Ethernet
 INTERBUS
 VinFast

References

External links
 Official website
 Phoenix Contact USA site
 Industrial Ethernet
 Phoenix Contact EtherNet/IP page
 INTERBUS Club (German)
 

Companies based in North Rhine-Westphalia
Electronics companies of Germany
Power supply manufacturers